Stephen Adeniran Oni  is an Anglican bishop in Nigeria:
he has been Bishop of Ondo since 2018.

Oni was educated at the University of Ibadan and ordained in 1999. He has a Special Life Membership Award from the Bible Society Of Nigeria

Notes

Anglican bishops of Ondo
21st-century Anglican bishops in Nigeria
1956 births
People from Ondo State
University of Ibadan alumni
Living people